Silke Vanwynsberghe (born 25 April 1997) is a Belgian footballer who plays as a defender for Anderlecht and the Belgium national team.

International career
Vanwynsberghe made her debut for the Belgium national team on 2 March 2018, against Spain.

References

1997 births
Living people
Women's association football defenders
Belgian women's footballers
Belgium women's international footballers
Lierse SK (women) players
K.A.A. Gent (women) players
RSC Anderlecht (women) players
BeNe League players
Super League Vrouwenvoetbal players